Voltaire is the pen name of French Enlightenment writer, historian, and philosopher François-Marie Arouet.

Voltaire may also refer to:

People
 Voltaire (given name), a list of people
 Aurelio Voltaire (born 1967), dark cabaret Cuban-American musician
 Jacqueline Voltaire (1948–2008), British-born Mexican actress, model and singer

Places
 Voltaire, North Dakota, a city in the United States
 Voltaire Township, Sherman County, Kansas, United States
 Voltaire (crater), an impact crater on the Martian moon Deimos
 5676 Voltaire, an asteroid

Ships
 French battleship Voltaire, a Danton-class pre-dreadnought battleship
 Voltaire, one of the names of the French ship Viala (1795), a ship of the line

Other uses
 Boulevard Voltaire, a boulevard in Paris
 Voltaire (Paris Métro), a Paris Métro station
 Voltaire (film), a 1933 biographical film starring George Arliss as the French writer and philosopher
 Voltaire (show jumping horse), an influential sire of show jumpers and dressage horses
 Le Voltaire (newspaper), a French daily newspaper established in 1878
 Voltaire (racehorse), a Thoroughbred racehorse
 Voltaire, a computer network equipment manufacturer acquired by Mellanox Technologies in 2010
 Voltaire Network, an international non-profit organization

See also
 Voltaire Foundation, at the University of Oxford, U.K.
 Voltaire Human Rights Awards, given by Liberty Victoria, Australia
 Voltaire Prize for Tolerance, International Understanding and Respect for Differences, given by the University of Potsdam, Germany